James S. Irick  (July 30, 1923 – February 18, 1993) was an American football, basketball, tennis, and track coach and college athletics administrator. He served as the head football coach at Baker University in Baldwin City, Kansas for 13 seasons, from 1963 to 1975, compiling a record of 48–64–4. He took over the position from longtime coach Karl Spear who moved up to become the school's athletic director.

Irick graduated from high school in Paola, Kansas in 1941. He then attended Baker College, playing football and basketball under head coach Emil Liston. He graduated from Baker in 1948 after a stint in the military and later earned master's degree from Kansas State Teachers College of Pittsburg,—now known as Pittsburg State University. Irick died of a brain aneurysm, on February 18, 1993, at the University of Kansas Medical Center in Kansas City, Kansas.

Head coaching record

Football

References

External links
 

1923 births
1993 deaths
American men's basketball players
Baker Wildcats athletic directors
Baker Wildcats football coaches
Baker Wildcats football players
Baker Wildcats men's basketball coaches
Baker Wildcats men's basketball players
College men's basketball head coaches in the United States
College tennis coaches in the United States
College track and field coaches in the United States
Pittsburg State University alumni
United States Army personnel of World War II
People from Paola, Kansas
Players of American football from Kansas
Coaches of American football from Kansas
Basketball coaches from Kansas
Basketball players from Kansas
People from Ottawa County, Oklahoma